North Butler High School is a rural public high school in Greene, Iowa, United States. It is a part of the North Butler Community School District; it was operated by the Greene Community School District until 2011, when that district merged into the North Butler district.

It was a merger of Greene High School and Allison–Bristow High School, and it began operations in 2004 after the Greene and Allison–Bristow school districts began a grade-sharing agreement. Circa 2004 its expected enrollment was about 800.

Athletics
The athletic extracurricular activities at North Butler High School are cross country, football, volleyball, basketball, wrestling, golf, track and field, softball, baseball, cheer leading, and dance team. The Bearcats participate in the Top of Iowa Conference.

In 2004, its American football classification was 1A, while its predecessor schools were Class A.

State championships
The girls' basketball team were the Class 2A State Champions in 2006 and 2007.

See also
 List of high schools in Iowa

References

External links
 Official website
 

Public high schools in Iowa
Schools in Butler County, Iowa
2004 establishments in Iowa
Educational institutions established in 2004